The 10th constituency of the Yvelines is a French legislative constituency in the Yvelines département.

Description

Yvelines' 10th constituency covers the largely rural southern territory of the department and is its largest seat.

The seat has elected conservatives at every legislative election since its creation in 1988. However in 2010 the seat was won in a by-election Anny Poursinoff of the EELV. The seat returned to its historic pattern in 2012 when it elected the man she defeated in that by-election Jean-Frédéric Poisson of the PCD.

Historic Representation

Election results

2022

 
 
 
 
 
 
 
|-
| colspan="8" bgcolor="#E9E9E9"|
|-

2017

 
 
 
 
 
 
|-
| colspan="8" bgcolor="#E9E9E9"|
|-

2012

 
 
 
 
 
 
|-
| colspan="8" bgcolor="#E9E9E9"|
|-

2010 by-election
MP Christine Boutin's resignation in 2009 precipitated a by-election, which was won by UMP candidate Jean-Frédéric Poisson with a lead of just five votes over Greens candidate Anny Poursinoff. An appeal and recount led the Constitutional Council to first declare Poisson had won by just one vote, and then ultimately to order a fresh by-election which was held on the 4th and 10 July 2010. Poisson and Poursinoff again advanced to the second round, and Poursinoff was elected with a clear lead of 1,005 votes.

 
 
 
 
 
|-
| colspan="8" bgcolor="#E9E9E9"|
|-

2007

 
 
 
 
 
 
|-
| colspan="8" bgcolor="#E9E9E9"|
|-

2002

 
 
 
 
 
 
|-
| colspan="8" bgcolor="#E9E9E9"|
|-

1997

 
 
 
 
 
 
 
|-
| colspan="8" bgcolor="#E9E9E9"|
|-

Sources
 Official results of French elections from 1998:

References 

10